A third baseman, abbreviated 3B, is the player in baseball or softball whose responsibility is to defend the area nearest to third base —  the third of four bases a baserunner must touch in succession to score a run. In the scoring system used to record defensive plays, the third baseman is assigned the number 5.

Third base is known as the "hot corner", because the third baseman is often the infielder who stands closest to the batter—roughly 90–120 feet away, but even closer if a bunt is expected. Most right-handed hitters tend to hit the ball hard in this direction. A third baseman must possess good hand-eye coordination and quick reactions to catch batted balls whose speed can exceed .

The third base position requires a strong and accurate arm, as the third baseman often makes long throws to first base or quick ones to second base to start a double play. As with middle infielders, right-handed throwing players are standard at the position because they do not need to turn their body before throwing across the infield to first base. Mike Squires, who played fourteen games at third base in 1982 and 1983, is a very rare example of a third baseman who threw lefty. Some third basemen have been converted from middle infielders or outfielders because the position does not require them to run as fast.

The third baseman must also field fly balls in fair and foul territories.

Expectations of how well a third baseman should be able to hit have risen over time; in the early years of the sport, these expectations were similar to those for shortstops, the third baseman being merely the less skilled defensive player. Players who could hit with more ability often were not suited for third base, either because they were left-handed or because they were not mobile enough for the position. However, the beginning of the live-ball era in the 1920s created a greater demand for more offense, and third basemen have since been expected to hit either for a high average (.290 or better) or with moderate to substantial power.  Since the 1950s the position has become more of a power position with sluggers such as Eddie Mathews, Mike Schmidt and Ron Santo becoming stars.

There are fewer third basemen in the Baseball Hall of Fame than there are Hall of Famers of any other position. Few third basemen have gone on to have successful managing careers; exceptions include John McGraw, Bobby Cox, Jimmy Dykes, and Negro leaguer Dave Malarcher.

Prominent third basemen

Baseball Hall of Fame members

Frank "Home Run" Baker
Johnny Bench (elected as a catcher, shifted to third base in last three years of his career)
Wade Boggs
George Brett (played first base and designated hitter in the latter years of his career)
Jimmy Collins
Ray Dandridge (Negro leagues)
Judy Johnson (Negro leagues)
Chipper Jones
George Kell
Freddie Lindstrom
Edgar Martínez (primarily a designated hitter who was the regular third baseman for the Seattle Mariners in the early years of his career)
Eddie Mathews
John McGraw (primarily elected as a manager, although a third baseman in his short but successful playing career)
Paul Molitor (longtime designated hitter who played primarily third base on the field)
Brooks Robinson
Scott Rolen (to be inducted August 2023)
Ron Santo
Mike Schmidt
Pie Traynor (First third baseman to be inducted into the Baseball Hall of Fame)
Jud Wilson (Negro leagues)

Multiple Gold Glove Award winners

Brooks Robinson: 16
Mike Schmidt: 10
Nolan Arenado: 10 (active)
Scott Rolen: 8 
Eric Chavez: 6
Robin Ventura: 6
Buddy Bell: 6
Ken Boyer: 5
Doug Rader: 5
Ron Santo: 5
Gary Gaetti: 4
Adrián Beltré: 4
Matt Williams: 4
Ken Caminiti: 3
Frank Malzone: 3
Evan Longoria: 3 (active)
Matt Chapman: 3 (active)
David Wright: 2
Wade Boggs: 2
Graig Nettles: 2
Manny Machado: 2 (active)

All-time single-season assists leaders among third basemen
Graig Nettles: 412 (Cleveland Indians, 1971)
Graig Nettles: 410 (New York Yankees, 1973)
Brooks Robinson: 410 (Baltimore Orioles, 1974)
Brooks Robinson: 405 (Baltimore Orioles, 1967)
Harlond Clift: 405 (St. Louis Browns, 1937)
Mike Schmidt: 404 (Philadelphia Phillies, 1974)
Doug DeCinces: 399 (California Angels, 1982)
Brandon Inge: 398 (Detroit Tigers, 2006)
Clete Boyer: 396 (New York Yankees, 1962)
Mike Schmidt: 396 (Philadelphia Phillies, 1977)
Buddy Bell: 396 (Texas Rangers, 1982)

All-time single-season putouts leaders among third basemen
 Denny Lyons: 255 (Philadelphia Athletics, 1887)
 Jimmy Williams: 251 (Pittsburgh Pirates, 1899)
 Jimmy Collins: 251 (Boston Beaneaters [National League], 1900)
 Jimmy Collins: 243 (Boston Beaneaters [National League], 1898)
 Willie Kamm: 243 (Chicago White Sox, 1928)
 Willie Kamm: 236 (Chicago White Sox, 1927)
 Frank Baker: 233 (Philadelphia Athletics, 1913)
 Bill Coughlin: 232 (Washington Senators, 1901)
 Ernie Courtney: 229 (Philadelphia Phillies, 1905)
 Jimmy Austin: 228 (St. Louis Browns, 1911)

References

Baseball positions